Hervé Bacqué (born 13 July 1976 in Bordeaux) is a French former professional football player.

References

1976 births
Living people
French footballers
FC Libourne players
FC Lorient players
French expatriate footballers
Expatriate footballers in England
Luton Town F.C. players
Expatriate footballers in Scotland
Scottish Premier League players
Motherwell F.C. players
Expatriate footballers in Norway
Lyn Fotball players
Expatriate footballers in Brazil
Coritiba Foot Ball Club players
Eliteserien players
French expatriate sportspeople in England
French expatriate sportspeople in Scotland
French expatriate sportspeople in Brazil
French expatriate sportspeople in Norway
Stade Bordelais (football) players
Tarbes Pyrénées Football players
Balma SC players
Association football midfielders